Doctor Smurf (original French title Docteur Schtroumpf) is the eighteenth Smurfs comic book.

Summary

When Handy Smurf and Clumsy Smurf are installing a fence for Farmer Smurf, Handy Smurf mistakenly hits Clumsy Smurf with his hammer, so Papa Smurf is called to attend Clumsy Smurf's injury. The three Smurfs are grateful that Papa Smurf is there when they need him.

One day, Sickly Smurf believes he's sick, so he goes to ask for medicine from Papa Smurf who, knowing that Sickly Smurf's sickness is psychosomatic, just tells him to drink some vegetable soup and rest, as a placebo. However, another Smurf who was just returning from fishing sees Sickly Smurf and asks him what happened, and when Sickly Smurf tells him, the Smurf recommends him some horehound tea instead, something he heard from either Farmer Smurf or Cook Smurf (he doesn't seem to remember very well).

The next day, Sickly Smurf comes with a new sickness and the Smurf recommends him blackberry roots. When Handy Smurf tries to dismiss the Smurf's recommendations and tells Sickly Smurf to follow Papa Smurf's advice instead, the Smurf ends up convincing Handy Smurf that he's sick, too. The following day, Handy Smurf asks the Smurf for a remedy, so the Smurf gives him a recipe. After this, the Smurf notices that Papa Smurf doesn't have time to see all and every sick Smurf, so he becomes Doctor Smurf.

However, nobody attends Doctor Smurf's house until he decides to have Smurfette as his nurse. Drummer Smurf announces this and soon a huge line of Smurfs is formed in front of Doctor Smurf's house. The first patients are Greedy Smurf, Jokey Smurf and Enamored Smurf.

Papa Smurf finds Vanity Smurf with a prescription from Doctor Smurf. He tells Vanity Smurf to throw that prescription to the trashcan and rather drink honey tea, but the conversation doesn't go beyond that because Miner Smurf brings an ingredient Papa Smurf needed. Vanity Smurf asks Doctor Smurf's opinion about this, and Doctor Smurf dismisses Papa Smurf's style of medicine as outdated. He then goes to Handy Smurf's house and mistakenly gives him a sleeping potion instead of medicine.

Doctor Smurf gives medical licenses to all Smurfs, so they stop working at the dam. Brainy Smurf tells this to Papa Smurf, who scolds Doctor Smurf, but then Papa Smurf falls sick and Doctor Smurf gives him some medicine. During this time, Doctor Smurf forgets he was attending Clumsy Smurf, who is left naked waiting for his examination.

Since Papa Smurf is sick, Doctor Smurf gets more work, for example bandaging Jokey Smurf who has accidentally hammered his own finger (and ends bandaging everything save for the finger), and recommends three or five potions to each Smurf (save for Grouchy Smurf who, as expected, hates Doctor Smurf and his potions, and hates those Smurfs who drink potions to get better even though they aren't sick).

Having more work to do, Doctor Smurf asks Handy Smurf to build him a hospital, where he attends several Smurfs at a time and frequently gives Papa Smurf his medicine. He also begins wearing a white coat. When a Smurf gets hurt, Doctor Smurf mobilizes an ambulance which causes more Smurfs to get hurt.

Things get worse when two other Smurfs try to find new styles of medicine; they go to Papa Smurf's laboratory to check his books, and one of them decides to try psychology while the other tries acupuncture. The acupuncturist tries his method on Vanity Smurf, who escapes but ends punctured anyway when he falls on Farmer Smurf's cacti. The psychologist tries to psychoanalyze Clumsy Smurf, but the one who ends up feeling better is the psychologist himself.

Doctor Smurf calls both Smurfs to scold them for doing medicine, but they dismiss him and continue with their own methods. After this, several other Smurfs begin to try their own methods like hydrotherapy, physiotherapy, podiatry, etc., and some Smurfs even try all methods at once.

Meanwhile, at Doctor Smurf's hospital, Papa Smurf refuses the medicine claiming it doesn't have any effect and Doctor Smurf is no real doctor. Suddenly, Smurfette falls sick. Doctor Smurf tells her she will get better with one of his potions, but then the other doctor Smurfs try to use their own methods until Papa Smurf sends Brainy Smurf and Hefty Smurf after Master Ludovic, a doctor friend of Homnibus who lives at the forest.

When the Smurfs give Ludovic a letter from Papa Smurf explaining the situation, he goes to help accompanied by his advisor, Gargamel. Hefty Smurf warns Master Ludovic that Gargamel is the Smurfs' enemy, but Gargamel convinces Ludovic that it's just a misunderstanding, so the Smurfs grudgingly guide both to the village.

When Ludovic finds Doctor Smurf gave Smurfette a potion of wormwood mixed with a decoction of four-leaf clovers, and the same to Papa Smurf, he scolds Doctor Smurf (and the other doctors too) for applying medicine as a sort of game. Then he makes a potion that restores Papa Smurf and Smurfette. After leaving the village, Ludovic and Gargamel say goodbye to each other, and then Gargamel tries to return to the Smurf Village, but ends at his own house.

At the village, a Smurf falls sick. Doctor Smurf (back in his normal Smurf attires) is about to recommend him a potion, but when Papa Smurf arrives, Doctor Smurf recognises it's better to leave Papa Smurf to take matters in his hands.

Notes

 Despite this story being previous to The Gambler Smurfs, the Smurfs who carry the ambulance appear playing cards when not at work.

See also
Characters in The Smurfs

The Smurfs books